Janice Acoose (1954-2020) was a Canadian author, newspaper columnist, filmmaker, indigenous language advocate, and professor of indigenous and English literature at First Nations University of Canada in Saskatchewan.

Early life and family
Acoose was born in Broadview, Saskatchewan, and attended the Cowessess Indian Residential School in the 1960s. Her cultural roots stemmed from the Zagime Anishinabek (Saulteaux) First Nation and the Ninankawe Marival Metis.

Her father's mother was Madelaine O'Soup, adopted daughter of O'Soup, Chief of the Anishnabe at O'Soup Reserve. Her father's father was Paul Acoose, from the nearby Sakimay Reserve.

Works
Acoose was Saskatchewan's first Native Affairs columnist for the Saskatoon Star-Phoenix. She also regularly contributed to the Regina Leader-Post, the Prince Albert Herald, Aboriginal Voices, New Breed and Windspeaker.

In 1995, Toronto's Women's Press published her book Iskwewak Kah Yaw Ni Wahkomakanak. A copy of her Masters Thesis Iskwewak--Kah' Ki Yaw Ni Wahkomakanak: Neither Indian princesses nor squaw drudges is freely available online.

Acoose was interviewed in the 2006 National Film Board of Canada documentary Finding Dawn, about murdered and missing Aboriginal women in Canada.

References

First Nations journalists
Canadian women non-fiction writers
First Nations women writers
1954 births
Living people
Writers from Saskatchewan
People from Broadview, Saskatchewan
Saulteaux people
Canadian women journalists
20th-century First Nations writers
21st-century First Nations writers
20th-century Canadian non-fiction writers
21st-century Canadian non-fiction writers
20th-century Canadian women writers
21st-century Canadian women writers
Canadian indigenous women academics
First Nations academics